Winchester is an unincorporated community in Van Buren County, in the U.S. state of Iowa.

History
 Winchester was laid out in 1840. A post office was established at Winchester in 1840, and remained in operation until it was discontinued in 1903.

References

Unincorporated communities in Van Buren County, Iowa
Unincorporated communities in Iowa